The Burgenland state election of 2000 was held in the Austrian state of Burgenland on 3 December 2000.

The Social Democratic Party of Austria (SPÖ) won the election, with Hans Niessl returning as state governor (Landeshauptmann). He had previously taken over the office in late 2000 from Karl Stix.

Burgenland state election
State elections in Austria
Burgenland state election